Luca Bucci (born 13 March 1969) is an Italian former professional footballer who played as a football goalkeeper. Bucci played for several Italian clubs throughout his career; he is mostly remembered for his successful spell with Parma, where he won various domestic and European titles. At international level, he represented the Italy national football team, and was an unused member of the team that reached the 1994 FIFA World Cup Final, and a reserve goalkeeper for Italy at UEFA Euro 1996.

Club career
Born in Bologna, Bucci spent a few years in the third and second levels (winning the 1992–93 Serie B title with Reggiana). He made his Serie A debut playing for Parma, in a league match against Udinese  on 29 August 1993. He soon achieved  prominence during a particularly successful stint with the club, winning an UEFA Supercup in 1993, and an UEFA Cup in 1995; he also received runners-up medals in the Coppa Italia, in the Cup Winners' Cup, in the Supercoppa Italiana, and in Serie A with the club. Bucci was the starting keeper for Parma when they won the UEFA cup in 1995. At Parma, however, Bucci was soon overtaken by the emergence of 18-year-old Primavera keeper Gianluigi Buffon during the 1996–97 season. Bucci started the season as the starting keeper for the first seven games. After a dispute with coach Carlo Ancelotti and emergence of Buffon, Bucci left the team in order to play more regularly.

After playing six months for Perugia, Bucci joined second-tier Torino in 1997, later gaining promotion to Serie A throughout his time with the Turin club after winning the 2000–01 Serie B title with the club, and remaining with the granata for six seasons, until his contract expired. He then decided to join Empoli. However, he only managed to play in half of the games, while the club was eventually relegated, with Bucci leaving at the end of season.

After six months without a club, Bucci moved back to Parma in January 2005 to replace Gianluca Berti who left for Torino, initially as a reserve goalkeeper. He was the first choice after Sébastien Frey’s departure, ahead of Cristiano Lupatelli and Matteo Guardalben in the 2005–06 season, Alfonso De Lucia and Fabio Virgili in the 2006–07 season, Nicola Pavarini and Radek Petr in the 2007–08 season. After Parma's relegated he was released in June 2008.

After another seven months as a free agent, he joined Napoli, following an injury crisis that hit the club. He made his debut with Napoli on 19 April, in a 2–0 away loss to Cagliari, becoming the fifth goalkeeper to be used by the azzurri in the 2008–09 season (the other four being Gennaro Iezzo, Nicolás Navarro, Matteo Gianello and Luigi Sepe).

International career
Uncapped, Bucci was called by Italy manager Arrigo Sacchi as Italy's third goalkeeper for the 1994 FIFA World Cup in the United States, behind Gianluca Pagliuca and Luca Marchegiani, making no appearances. Italy finished the tournament in second place, after losing on penalties in the final against Brazil. He would make his full debut on 21 December of that year, appearing in a 3–1 friendly win over Turkey. He was also a back-up goalkeeper for Italy at UEFA Euro 1996. In total, Bucci made three senior appearances for Italy between 1994 and 1996.

Style of play
In spite of his relatively short stature for a goalkeeper, Bucci was a reliable and physically strong keeper, who was known for his consistency, athleticism, explosiveness, agility, and acrobatic style of play; although he had a reserved character, he was a confident and resolute goalkeeper, with a strong temper, who often stood out for his instinctive and aggressive playing style. Considered to be one of the best Italian goalkeepers of his generation, throughout his career, he was highly regarded for his speed when rushing off his line to anticipate strikers outside the area who had beaten the offside trap, and for his ability to get to ground quickly to collect or parry the ball, and was also effective at stopping penalties. Furthermore, Bucci was highly competent with the ball at his feet, and often functioned as a sweeper-keeper in teams which relied on a zonal marking system and high defensive lines. Due to his distribution, he was also capable of starting plays and launching attacks from the back. Bucci also stood out for his longevity.

Post-playing career
After the 2008–09 season, Bucci decided to retire from professional football and became a youth team goalkeeper coach at Parma. In 2015, he joined Bologna as the club's goalkeeping coach, under his former Parma manager Roberto Donadoni.

Honours
Reggiana
 Serie B: 1992–93

Parma
 UEFA Cup: 1994–95
 UEFA Super Cup: 1993

Torino
 Serie B: 2000–01

References

External links

Gazzetta profile 

1969 births
Living people
Footballers from Bologna
Association football goalkeepers
Italian footballers
Serie A players
Serie B players
Serie C players
Parma Calcio 1913 players
Casertana F.C. players
Aurora Pro Patria 1919 players
A.C. Reggiana 1919 players
A.C. Perugia Calcio players
Torino F.C. players
Empoli F.C. players
S.S.C. Napoli players
Italy international footballers
1994 FIFA World Cup players
UEFA Euro 1996 players
UEFA Cup winning players